("senior group leader") was a paramilitary rank in Nazi Germany that was first created in 1932 as a rank of the Sturmabteilung (SA) and adopted by the Schutzstaffel (SS) one year later. Until April 1942, it was the highest commissioned SS rank after only Reichsführer-SS. Translated as "senior group leader", the rank of Obergruppenführer was senior to Gruppenführer. A similarly named rank of Untergruppenführer existed in the SA from 1929 to 1930 and as a title until 1933.  In April 1942, the new rank of SS-Oberst-Gruppenführer was created which was above Obergruppenführer and below Reichsführer-SS.

Creation and history
The rank of Obergruppenführer was created in 1932 by Ernst Röhm and was intended as a seniormost rank of the Nazi stormtroopers for use by Röhm and his top SA generals. In its initial concept, the rank was intended to be held by members of the Oberste SA-Führung (Supreme SA Command) and also by veteran commanders of certain SA-Gruppen (SA groups).  Some of the early promotions to the rank included Ernst Röhm, Viktor Lutze, Edmund Heines, August Schneidhüber, and Fritz Ritter von Krausser.

The rank of SA-Obergruppenführer was the most senior rank of the Sturmabteilung until the spring of 1933, when Rohm made the title position of Stabschef (SA Chief of Staff) into a rank and promoted himself accordingly.

Also in the summer of 1933, Heinrich Himmler was promoted by Adolf Hitler to the newly created rank of SS-Obergruppenführer with the intent being to make Himmler the equivalent of the senior commanders of the SA, to which the SS was still subordinated.  Although Himmler usually referred to himself as Reichsführer-SS, before the summer of 1934, this was simply a title for the SS commander, and not yet an actual rank.  Shortly after Himmler's promotion, Hitler further promoted Franz Xaver Schwarz, with Himmler's date of rank backdated to 1 January 1933 in order to confirm his seniority as the top officer within the SS.  Shortly after Rudolf Hess was appointed as his deputy in April 1933, Hitler promoted him to SS-Obergruppenführer.  However, in September, Hitler decreed that Hess should no longer use the title of Obergruppenführer but only use the title of Deputy Führer.

A number of men were promoted to SS-Obergruppenführer in 1934, these being Fritz Weitzel, Richard Walther Darré and Walter Buch.  After the Night of the Long Knives in July 1934, Sepp Dietrich was promoted to the rank.  On 9 September 1934, so as to prevent a power struggle within the SS, Hitler further promoted Kurt Daluege who commanded most of the SS in the Berlin region. Daluege's promotion was to avoid the SS splitting into two separate entities, one based in Northern Germany under Daluege and the other in Bavaria under Himmler.  This early SS disunity became a non-issue after a common ground was found amongst SS leaders in their general hatred of the SA.

Udo von Woyrsch and Friedrich-Wilhelm Krüger were promoted to SS-Obergruppenführer in 1935 while Josias, Hereditary Prince of Waldeck and Pyrmont, and Max Amann received the rank a year later along with Karl von Eberstein and Philipp Bouhler.  The year 1936 saw several promotions to the rank, including Friedrich Jeckeln who would become one of the most infamous SS and police leaders on the Eastern Front during World War II.  The last pre-war promotion to the rank of SS-Obergruppenführer was in 1937 for Ernst-Heinrich Schmauser.  Upon the outbreak of World War II, there were seventeen men who held the rank of SS-Obergruppenführer.

Promotion history

During the Second World War, there were 88 promotions to the rank, of which 22 were considered regular officers of the Waffen-SS and the rest members of the Allgemeine SS. The first wartime promotions to SS-Obergruppenführer occurred in April 1940 when the rank was granted to Joachim von Ribbentrop, Martin Bormann and Hans Lammers; Arthur Seyss-Inquart and Otto Dietrich were promoted a year later. All five promotions were honorary SS ranks with the first promotion of an active SS officer occurring in September 1941 when the rank was granted to Reinhard Heydrich. The Waffen-SS commander, Paul Hausser was promoted to the rank of SS-Obergruppenführer on 1 October 1941. Waffen-SS commander Theodor Eicke was promoted to SS-Obergruppenführer und General der Waffen-SS on 20 April 1942. Sepp Dietrich remained senior, having served as General der SS-VT (SS-Verfügungstruppe) upon the outbreak of World War II in 1939.

Two SS officers would be demoted from the rank of SS-Obergruppenführer: Rudolf Hess and Wolf-Heinrich Graf von Helldorff. Hess was stripped of his rank and expelled from both the SS and Nazi Party after his abortive flight to Scotland in 1941. Helldorff was stricken from the SS rolls in 1944 after the 20 July plot against Hitler. Helldorff was a unique case, in that his SS rank had been bestowed for technical reasons in order to command the Berlin Police. While holding SA membership, Helldorff was never actually an SS member although for administrative purposes he held SS rank and was ranked as the 15th most senior SS officer.

A total of 106 men would eventually hold the rank of SS-Obergruppenführer with 97 such officers listed on the SS seniority list in 1944. Several men with the rank would die during World War II; some of the more notable being Reinhard Heydrich, Theodor Eicke, and Artur Phleps.  The last promotion was made in March 1945 to Hans Kammler.

Rank usage
The rank of Obergruppenführer was used by four major paramilitary groups of the Nazi Party, these being the SA, SS, National Socialist Motor Corps, and National Socialist Flyers Corps.  The rank would remain the highest SS general officer rank until April 1942, when the rank of SS-Oberst-Gruppenführer was created.

Standard practice for SS generals serving as an SS and police leader, as well as those senior SS personnel of the RSHA, was to hold dual police rank as SS-Obergruppenführer und General der Polizei.  SS-Obergruppenführer und General der Waffen-SS was the equivalent in the armed SS; in 1944, most active SS generals received this designation in order to command military troops during the last days of the war.  Approximately fifteen SS generals were ranked as SS-Obergruppenführer und General der Polizei und Waffen-SS.

SS-Obergruppenführer was considered the highest rank of the Allgemeine SS until April 1942; equivalent to a lieutenant general (three-star general) in the American and British armies. It was only outranked by Himmler's special rank of Reichsführer-SS. However, within the Waffen-SS, the rank of SS-Gruppenführer was equivalent to a Generalleutnant, and an SS-Obergruppenführer came to be considered the equivalent of a General; holders were titled in full SS-Obergruppenführer und General der Waffen-SS.

Rank insignia

See also
Corps colours (Waffen-SS)
List of SS-Obergruppenführer
Table of ranks and insignia of the Waffen-SS

Notes

Bibliography

 
 
 
 
 
 
 
 
 
 
 
 

 
SS ranks
Nazi paramilitary ranks
German words and phrases
Three-star officers of Nazi Germany
Lists of generals